The 1974 Iowa State Cyclones football team represented Iowa State University in the Big Eight Conference during the 1974 NCAA Division I football season. In their second year under head coach Earle Bruce, the Cyclones compiled a 4–7 record (2–5 against conference opponents), finished in sixth place in the conference, and were outscored by opponents by a combined total of 198 to 186. They played their home games at Clyde Williams Field in Ames, Iowa.

Phil Danowsky, Rick Howe, and Mike Strachan were the team captains.

Schedule

Coaching staff

Roster

References

Iowa State
Iowa State Cyclones football seasons
Iowa State Cyclones football